As Ela, As Eyla, It is located around  southwest of the capital, Djibouti City and 5 km (3 miles) north of the border with Ethiopia. It is located along the National Highway 6. Tourist richness which the crater formed Lake Abbe, As' Eyla Province is located within the boundaries.

Demographics
As of 2016, the population of As Eyla has been estimated to be 17,000. The town inhabitants belong to various mainly Afro-Asiatic-speaking ethnic groups (Afar and Somali-Issa),

History

Asa Ragid
On Asa Ragid site, the material found consists of shell middens from oysters, basalt rhyolite peaks whose dating for older, is at 5000–5800 years BC Also circular stone structures and a microlithic industry red jasper and obsidian and pottery shards more or less decorated beads and ostrich egg shell. As for the site of Asa Koma (Red Hill) near  to As Eyla, he revealed a life towards the end of the third millennium with a population of fishermen who hunted jackal, raised cattle and made pottery decorated with prints and chiseled features of good quality and which shapes and colors are similar to ceramics found in Sudan. It was discovered in 1989 a burial of an elderly adult and a young woman of 18. Many lithic obsidian and bone tools and beads of ostrich egg shells or shells of the Red Sea. Also animal bones, especially jackals, hippos rarely or gazelles, antelopes and domestic cattle and bones of fish (tilapia and catfish). Spread throughout the country and in more recent times are the cairn housing Graves (hundreds in the north). In one of these mounds in Balho, we found a fragment of cranium from the early first millennium BC The diversity of these burials attests different periods to which they relate.

French Somaliland
The village was originally built on the plain of Gobaad near a wadi, with houses constructed of mud and stone, before the French arrived. From 1862 until 1894, the land to the north of the Gulf of Tadjoura was called Obock and was ruled by Somali and Afar Sultans, local authorities with whom France signed various treaties between 1883 and 1887 to first gain a foothold in the region. The French colonial authorities built a garrison station in 1934. An elementary school] was established in the village in 1949, and there were several shops. Most of the inhabitants earned their living through animal husbandry and commerce, and used a well for drinking water.

Climate

References

Populated places in Djibouti